Kot Abbas Shaheed railway station (Urdu and ) is located in Kot Abbas Shaheed village, Khanewal district of Punjab province, Pakistan.

See also
 List of railway stations in Pakistan
 Pakistan Railways

References

External links

Railway stations in Khanewal District
Defunct railway stations in Pakistan
Railway stations on Karachi–Peshawar Line (ML 1)